Howard Odum may refer to:
 Howard W. Odum (1884–1954), American sociologist
 Howard T. Odum (1924–2002), his son, ecologist